Władysław Baczyński (1918 – May 17, 1960) was a Polish serial killer who killed 4 people in Wrocław and Bytom from 1946 to 1957.

Crimes
The first victim of Baczyński's crime spree was Anna S., killed in 1946 in Bytom. The next victims were killed in Wrocław ten years later, all of them gunned down. When asked about the motive behind the murders, Baczyński explained that he felt aversion towards people who, due to their character, had a tendency to hurt their colleagues. In his opinion, such people were his victims, who were his subordinates for a long time.

Trial and execution
Baczyński confessed to three out of the four murders, noting that he would've killed even more people. At the time of his trial, he initially tried to simulate a mental illness, but later dropped the act, showing no remorse for his actions. His trial resulted in a death sentence, which Baczyński tried to appeal in the Council of State, but his request was rejected. On May 17, 1960, he was executed by hanging.

Victims

See also
List of serial killers by country

References

1918 births
1946 murders in Poland
1957 murders in Poland
1960 deaths
1940s murders in Poland
1950s murders in Poland
Executed Polish serial killers
Male serial killers
People executed by Poland by hanging
People executed by the Polish People's Republic